Shivangi Joshi (born 18 May 1998) is an Indian actress who primarily works in Hindi television. She made her acting debut with Khelti Hai Zindagi Aankh Micholi portraying Trisha in 2013. Joshi is best known for her portrayal of dual role Naira Singhania Goenka and Sirat Shekhawat Goenka in Yeh Rishta Kya Kehlata Hai for which she received several awards including Gold Awards.

Joshi's other notable works include portraying Aayat Haider in Beintehaa, Poonam Thakur in Begusarai and Anandi Chaturvedi in Balika Vadhu 2. In 2022, she participated in Khatron Ke Khiladi 12 and finished at 12th place.

Early life
Joshi was born on 18 May 1998 in Pune, Maharashtra. She did her schooling in Dehradun, Uttarakhand.

Career
Joshi made her television debut in 2013 with Zee TV's Khelti Hai Zindagi Aankh Micholi. Subsequently, she went on to play Aayat Haider in Beintehaa. In 2014, she appeared as Vishy in Love by Chance. She later played Poonam Thakur in Begusarai, opposite Vishal Aditya Singh.

In 2016, she first appeared as Meera in Season 4 of Yeh Hai Aashiqui and then as Jyoti in Pyaar Tune Kya Kiya. In the same year, she began portraying Naira Singhania Goenka in Star Plus's Yeh Rishta Kya Kehlata Hai. In January 2021, her character was killed off, but Joshi continued in the show, portraying a look-alike character, Sirat Shekhawat Goenka. Joshi left the show in October 2021, and this second character was also killed off.

In 2020, she was about to make her debut at the Cannes Film Festival with the film Our Own Sky, but due to the coronavirus, the film was later released in the OTT platform.

In November 2021, it was announced that she would appear as Anandi Bhujaariya in Colors TV's Balika Vadhu 2.

She has also featured in various music videos including Aadatein, Baarish and Teri Ada with Mohsin Khan, Kismat Teri, Aashiqui, O Dilbar Yaara with Shaheer Sheikh and Humnava with Stebin Ben.

In 2022, she participated in the stunt-based reality TV show Fear Factor: Khatron Ke Khiladi 12, which was filmed in Cape Town and finished at 12th place.

In the media

In UK-based newspaper Eastern Eyes List of 50 Sexiest Asian Women, she ranked 5th in 2018, while she ranked 7th in 2019. She was also ranked in Eastern Eyes Top 30 under 30 Global Asian Stars List of 2022.

In Times of Indias 20 Most Desirable Women on Indian Television List, she ranked 7th in 2019 and ranked 9th in 2020.

Filmography

Television

Special appearances

Web series

Music videos

Accolades

See also 
List of Indian television actresses

References

External links

 

Living people
Garhwali people
Indian television actresses
People from Maharashtra
Actresses from Maharashtra
1998 births
Fear Factor: Khatron Ke Khiladi participants